Events from the year 1993 in the United Kingdom.

Incumbents
Monarch – Elizabeth II 
Prime Minister –  John Major (Conservative)
Parliament – 51st

Events

January
 1 January
 Carlton Television, Meridian, Westcountry and GMTV begin broadcasting. Teletext Ltd. launches a new Teletext service on ITV and Channel 4, replacing the 14-year-old ORACLE teletext service.
 Ben Silcock, an inadequately treated schizophrenic patient, enters the lion enclosure in London Zoo.
 5 January – Oil tanker  runs aground on the South Mainland of Shetland, spilling 84,700 tonnes of crude oil into the sea.
 6 January – The first episode of the children's series The Animals of Farthing Wood begins on BBC One.
 8 January – Ford unveils its new Mondeo, a range of large family hatchbacks, saloons and estates which will reach showrooms on 22 March as a replacement for the long-running Sierra.
 10 January
 British newspapers carry reports that The Princess of Wales wants a divorce from The Prince of Wales, despite the announcement of their separation (issued the previous month) stating that there were no plans for a divorce.
 Braer Storm at peak intensity across the British Isles, breaking up the wrecked tanker Braer.
 11 January – British Airways admits liability and apologises "unreservedly" for a "dirty tricks" campaign against Virgin Atlantic.
 13 January – Wayne Edwards, a 26-year-old Lance corporal, becomes the first British fatality in the conflict in Bosnia, former Yugoslavia.
 17 January – Bookmakers cut their odds on the monarchy being abolished by the year 2000 from 100 to 1 to 50 to 1.
 21 January – Unemployment has increased for the 31st month running, but is still just short of the 3,000,000 total that was last seen nearly six years ago. Economists warn that it could hit a new high of more than 3,500,000 by the end of this year. However, the Conservatives have still managed to cut Labour's lead in the opinion polls from 13 points to eight points, according to the latest MORI poll.
 26 January – The Bank of England lowers interest rates to 6% – the lowest since 1978.

February
 1 February – Economists warn that unemployment could reach a new high of 3,400,000 this year.
 12 February – Murder of James Bulger: a 2-year-old is murdered by two ten-year-old boys on Merseyside.
 14 February – Unemployment is reported to be rising faster in Conservative seats than in Labour ones.
 15 February – The number of unfit homes in Britain is reported to have increased from 900,000 to more than 1,300,000 between 1986 and 1991.
 17 February – Shadow Chancellor Gordon Brown claims that a Labour government could reduce taxation – a dramatic turn for a party known for high taxation.
 18 February – Unemployment has reached 3,000,000 (and a rate of 10.6%) for the first time in six years.
 19 February – Judith Chaplin, Conservative MP for Newbury in Berkshire, dies suddenly at the age of 53 after less than a year in parliament.
 20 February – Economists are now warning that unemployment could rise as high at 3,500,000 within the next year.
 25 February – A MORI poll shows that 80% of Britons are dissatisfied with the way that John Major is running the country, and nearly 50% believe that the economy will get worse during this year.
 25–26 February – Warrington bomb attacks: Provisional Irish Republican Army (IRA) bombs are planted and explode at gas holders in Warrington, Cheshire.

March
 16 March – Chancellor Norman Lamont unveils a budget plan which is centred on economic recovery, together with phased introduction of Value Added Tax on domestic fuel bills (8% for 1994). This will be the last Spring budget.
 19 March – Unemployment has fallen for the first time since May 1990, now standing at 2,970,000, sparking hopes that the recession is nearly over.
 20 March – Warrington bomb attacks: IRA bombs in the town centre of Warrington claim the life of 3-year-old Jonathan Ball and injure more than 50 other people. On 25 March the blasts claim a second fatality when 12-year-old Timothy Parry dies in hospital from his injuries.
 22 March – The Ford Mondeo goes on sale.

April
 April – Staples, an American office superstore chain, opens its first store in Britain in Swansea.
 2 April – Vauxhall launches its all-new Corsa supermini, the replacement for the long-running Nova which like its predecessor is built at the Zaragoza plant in Spain.
 3 April – A false start forces the Grand National to be cancelled. The race results are made void for the first time in history.
 5 April
 Child Support Agency begins operation.
 Royal Logistic Corps formed within the British Army by union of five former corps: the Royal Engineers Postal and Courier Service, Royal Corps of Transport, Royal Army Ordnance Corps, Royal Pioneer Corps and Army Catering Corps.
 22 April – Black London teenager Stephen Lawrence is stabbed to death at Eltham in south London while waiting for a bus.
 24 April – Bishopsgate bombing. A massive IRA truck bomb explodes at Bishopsgate in the City of London. The blast destroys the medieval St Ethelburga's church, and badly damages the NatWest Tower and Liverpool Street tube station. A newspaper photographer is killed.
 26 April – Government declares official end of the recession after revealing that the economy grew by 0.6% in the first three months of this year. The recession began nearly three years ago and lasted much longer than most economists expected.
 29 April – The Queen announces that Buckingham Palace will open to the public for the first time.

May
 2 May - Manchester United become the first champions of the new FA Premier League after their last remaining title contenders, Aston Villa, lose 1–0 at home to Oldham Athletic. It is the first time in 26 years that Manchester United have been champions of the top division of English football.
 7 May
 The Conservatives lose a 12,357 majority in the Newbury by-election, with the Liberal Democrats gaining the seat by 22,055 votes under new MP David Rendel. The Conservative majority now stands at 19 seats.
 Grimethorpe Colliery in South Yorkshire is closed.
 13 May – Robert Adley, Conservative MP for Christchurch in Dorset, dies from a heart attack aged 58.
 14 May – The economic recovery continues as business failures are reported to have fallen for the second quarter running.
 20 May – The latest MORI poll shows that the Conservative government has yet to benefit from bringing the economy out of recession, as they trail Labour (who have 44% of the vote) by 16 points.
 22 May – Inflation reaches a 29-year low of 1.3%.
 27 May – Kenneth Clarke succeeds Norman Lamont as Chancellor of the Exchequer.

June
 Sunday newspaper The Observer is acquired by Guardian Media Group.
 3–5 June – Hollbeck Hall Hotel in Scarborough collapses into the sea following a landslide.
 10 June – Comedian and TV presenter Les Dawson dies suddenly from a heart attack during a medical check-up in Greater Manchester hospital at the age of 62.
 17 June – Unemployment now stands at less than 2,900,000 after the fourth successive monthly fall.
 20 June – A high speed train makes the first journey from France to England via the Channel Tunnel, which will open to the public next year.
 21 June – Andrew Wiles announces a proof to Fermat's Last Theorem at the Isaac Newton Institute. The proof is slightly flawed, but Wiles announces a revised proof the following year.
 24 June 
 Northern Ireland Minister Michael Mates resigns over links with fugitive tycoon Asil Nadir.
 Despite the recent end of the recession, support for the Conservative government has failed to recover, with the latest MORI poll showing that Labour has an 18-point lead over them with 46% of the vote.
 30 June – Michael Hunt, former deputy chairman of Nissan UK, is jailed for eight years for his involvement in Britain's worst case of tax fraud.

July
 July – The public sector trade union UNISON is formed by merger of the National and Local Government Officers Association (NALGO), the National Union of Public Employees (NUPE) and the Confederation of Health Service Employees (COHSE).
 16 July – MI5 publishes a booklet, The Security Service, revealing publicly for the first time its activities, operations and duties, as well as the identity and photographs of Stella Rimington as Director General.
 22 July – Government almost defeated by "Maastricht Rebels", however a vote of no confidence does not succeed.
 29 July – Conservative Party loses the Christchurch by-election to the Liberal Democrats – a seat they have held since 1910. New MP Diana Maddock gains more than 60% of the vote – twice as many as the Conservative candidate Robert Hayward. This sees the Conservative parliamentary majority fall to 17 seats.

August
 4 August – Labour Party leader John Smith opens Millwall F.C.'s New Den stadium in Bermondsey, London, which cost £16million to build and is the largest new football stadium to be built in England since before World War II.
 11 August – The Department of Health reveals that the number of people on hospital waiting lists has reached 1,000,000 for the first time.

September
 3 September – The UK Independence Party, which supports breakaway from the European Union, is formed by members of the Anti-Federalist League, which itself was formed two years earlier by opponents of Britain's involvement in the Maastricht Treaty.
 16 September – Unemployment has risen for the second month running, now standing at 2,922,100 (10.4% of the workforce), sparking fears that the economic recovery could be stalling and the economy could soon slide back into recession just months after coming out of it.
 17 September – The British National Party wins its first council seat, in the London Borough of Tower Hamlets.
 19 September – Production of the Ford Orion compact saloon ends.
 30 September – The Queen approves an honorary knighthood for General Colin Powell, who the day before retired as chief of United States Armed Forces.

October
 1 October – QVC launches the first television shopping channel in the UK.
 8 October – John Major launches his Back to Basics campaign.
16 October – Demonstration against the British National Party in Welling, where it has its headquarters.
 Unemployment falls this month by 49,000 – the biggest monthly fall since April 1989 – as the economic recovery continues.

November
 1 November – Women's Royal Naval Service disbanded, its members being fully absorbed into the regular Royal Navy.
 5 November – Civil servants stage a one-day strike.
 9 November – Princess Diana sues the Daily Mirror over photographs that were taken of her at a gym.
 17 November – The England national football team fails to qualify for the World Cup in America next summer, despite winning their final qualifying match 7–1 against San Marino. National manager Graham Taylor is expected to leave the job imminently. The Welsh national side also missed out on a place in the World Cup after Paul Bodin misses a penalty in a 2–1 defeat at home to Romania. At the Welsh game, a 67-year-old fan is killed by a rocket flare let off in the stands at Cardiff Arms Park.
 18 November – M40 minibus crash: In the early hours of the morning, ten children and a woman teacher from Hagley RC High School in Worcestershire are killed in a minibus crash on the M40 motorway near Warwick. An eleventh child dies in hospital several hours later and a twelfth in hospital as a result of their injuries on the following day, leaving just two girls surviving.
 24 November – Graham Taylor resigns as manager of the England football team after three years in charge.
 25 November – TV entertainer Roy Castle, 61, announces that he is suffering from a recurrence of the lung cancer which he was believed to have overcome one year ago.
 29 November – The Conservative government comes under a vitriolic attack in the House of Commons over allegations that it has secret contacts with the Provisional Irish Republican Army.

December
 3 December – Diana, Princess of Wales, announces her withdrawal from public life.
 9 December – Despite the steady economic recovery, the Conservative government is now 18 points behind Labour (who have 47% of the vote) in the latest MORI poll. The Liberal Democrats have also eaten into their support and now have 20% of the vote.
 10 December
 Richard J. Roberts wins the Nobel Prize in Physiology or Medicine jointly with Phillip Allen Sharp "for their discoveries of split genes".
 Last shift at Monkwearmouth Colliery, ending coal mining in the Durham Coalfield after at least 700 years.
 14 December – Yasser Arafat, Chairman of the Palestine Liberation Organization, makes his first official visit to Britain.
 15 December – The Downing Street Declaration on the future of Northern Ireland is signed between the UK and Irish governments.
 25 December – The Queen speaks of her hopes for peace in Northern Ireland in her Christmas Day speech.
 29 December – The Provisional IRA vows to fight on against the British presence in Northern Ireland.

Undated
 Completion of Thames Water Ring Main beneath London (80 km).
 New car sales enjoy an increase this year for the first time since 1989. The Ford Escort is Britain's best selling car for the second year running, while the new Ford Mondeo and Vauxhall Corsa enjoy strong sales in their first year on the British market.
 With the economy growing for the first time since spring 1990, inflation is at a 33-year low of 1.6%.

Publications
 Simon Armitage's poetry collection Book of Matches.
 Iain Banks' novel Complicity.
 Iain M. Banks' novel Against a Dark Background.
 Pat Barker's novel The Eye in the Door.
 Terry Deary's The Terrible Tudors, first in the Horrible Histories series.
 Sebastian Faulks' novel Birdsong.
 John McCarthy and Jill Morrell's account of his more than five years as a hostage in Lebanon Some Other Rainbow.
 Terry Pratchett's Discworld novel Men at Arms and his Johnny Maxwell novel Johnny and the Dead.
 Minette Walters' novel The Sculptress. 
 Irvine Welsh's novel Trainspotting.

Births
 1 January – Jon Flanagan, footballer
 5 January – Franz Drameh, actor
 10 January – Jacob Scipio, actor and writer
 11 January – Michael Keane, footballer
 12 January – Zayn Malik, pop singer-songwriter, member of One Direction
 13 January – Max Whitlock, gymnast
 21 January – John Cofie, footballer
 22 January – Tommy Knight, actor
 28 January – Will Poulter, actor
 30 January – Katy Marchant, track cyclist
 10 February
 Jack Butland, English footballer  
 Greg Kaziboni, Zimbabwe-born footballer
 12 February – Benik Afobe, English footballer  
 11 March – Jodie Comer, actress
 13 March – Tyrone Mings, footballer
 16 March – George Ford, England rugby union player
 24 March – Grace Cassidy, actress
 8 April – TBJZL, YouTuber
 9 April – Will Merrick, actor
 18 April – Nathan Sykes, singer
 19 April – Sebastian de Souza, English actor 
 24 April – Abigail Thorn, actress and YouTuber 
 6 May – Naomi Scott, actress, singer and musician
 9 May – Laura Muir, Scottish middle-distance runner
 12 May – Ali Price, Scotland rugby union player 
 13 May – Finn Harries, vlogger, designer and entrepreneur
 16 May – Josephine Gordon, jockey
 22 May – Edward Bluemel, actor
 28 May – Jonnie Peacock, sprinter
 19 June – KSI, YouTube personality
 23 June – Syndicate, YouTuber and Twitch streamer
 25 June – Barney Clark, actor
 29 June – Fran Kirby, footballer
 George Sampson, English street dancer, presenter, dancer, singer and actor  
 6 July – Melissa Steel, singer
 16 July – Katie McGlynn, actress
 18 July – Alex Esmail, actor and wrestler
 22 July – Amber Beattie, actress  
 26 July – Stormzy (Michael Ebenazer Kwadjo Omari Owuo Jr.), grime rapper
 27 July
 Alexandra Mardell, actress
 Max Power, footballer
 George Shelley, actor and singer
 28 July
 Harry Kane, footballer
 Cher Lloyd, pop singer
 Moses Odubajo, footballer
 2 August – Joivan Wade, actor  
 15 August – Alex Oxlade-Chamberlain, footballer
 29 August – Liam Payne, pop singer-songwriter, member of One Direction
 13 September – Niall Horan, Irish-born pop guitarist, member of One Direction
 15 September – Fady Elsayed, actor 
 17 September – Alfie Deyes, vlogger
 20 October –  David Bolarinwa, sprinter  
 9 November – Pete Dunne, wrestler and promoter
 25 November – Danny Kent, motorcycle racer
 30 November – Cherry Valentine, drag queen (died 2022)
 19 December – Hermione Corfield, actress
 27 December – Olivia Cooke, actress

Deaths
 17 January – Albert Hourani, historian (born 1915)
 20 January – Audrey Hepburn, actress, in Switzerland (born 1929)
 18 February – Jacqueline Hill, actress (born 1929)
 19 February – Judith Chaplin, politician (born 1939)
 24 February – Bobby Moore, footballer (born 1941)
 3 March – Tony Bland, football supporter injured in Hillsborough disaster in 1989 allowed to die after a landmark legal challenge by his family (born 1970)
 7 March 
Richard Fortescue, 7th Earl Fortescue, peer (born 1922) 
Patricia Lawrence, actress (born 1925)
Jeremy Tree, racehorse trainer (born 1925)
 9 March – C. Northcote Parkinson, historian (born 1909)
 17 March – Charlotte Hughes, longest-lived person ever documented in the UK (born 1877)
 15 April – Robert Westall, children's fiction writer (born 1929)
 18 April – Dame Elisabeth Frink, sculptor (born 1930)
 30 April – Tommy Caton, footballer (born 1962)
 5 May – Sir Dermot Boyle, British Royal Air Force commander (born 1904)
 6 May
 Ivy Benson, bandleader (born 1913)
 Ian Mikardo, politician (born 1908)
 13 May – Robert Adley, politician and writer (born 1935)
 30 May – Mel Rees, footballer (born 1968)
 10 June – Les Dawson, comedian (born 1931)
 11 June – Bernard Bresslaw, actor (born 1934)
 19 June – William Golding, novelist, Nobel Prize laureate (born 1911)
 21 June – Colin Dixon, Welsh rugby player (born 1943)
 20 August – Tony Barton, footballer, coach and manager (born 1937)
 25 August – Mildred Creak, child psychiatrist (born 1898)
 25 September – Sir John Moores, Founder and Chairman of Littlewoods 1923-1977 and 1980-1982 (born 1896)
 5 October – Jim Holton, footballer (born 1951)
 8 October – Peter Conder, ornithologist and conservationist (born 1919)
 22 November – Anthony Burgess, novelist (born 1917)
 28 November – Kenneth Connor, comic actor (born 1918)
 9 December – Danny Blanchflower, footballer, manager and writer (born 1926)

See also
 1993 in British music
 1993 in British television
 List of British films of 1993

References

 
Years of the 20th century in the United Kingdom
United Kingdom